Oldcodex (stylized as OLDCODEX) was a Japanese rock band from Tokyo, Japan, formed in 2009. They performed the opening themes for the anime series Free!, Servamp and God Eater and the ending themes for Kuroko's Basketball and Togainu no Chi. Their band name indicates their wish to "create their distinctiveness" in rock music. They also take on a unique concept, having a painter draw on canvas while the main vocalist sing on live stages.

History
Oldcodex was founded on October 21, 2009, by members Ta_2 (Tatsuhisa Suzuki) and R.O.N, who used to work with Ta_2 on his past solo projects. They debuted with the first mini album "OLDCODEX". They were accompanied by other members from another one named "ROSARYHILL", including R.O.N himself, YoHske and sae, though the last two did not stay from February 15, 2010, onward. On October 3, they put out their first full-length album, "hidemind", with 11 tracks in total. Many of their album covers were drawn by artist YORKE., who then became an official member of the band on November 1. Later on, the band witnessed drastic changes in the lineup, with new arrivals of 3 support members and R.O.N's departure on October 15, 2012. After 12 years of activities, the discography of Oldcodex includes 6 studio albums, a remix album, 3 mini albums, 18 singles and a digital single.

Oldcodex performed at Nippon Budokan on February 11, 2015.

On August 4, 2021, Ta_2 announced he was going on hiatus, with Oldcodex subsequently pausing their activities as well. This announcement came shortly after Shūkan Bunshun reported that he was involved in an extramarital affair with a female work associate. On August 30, 2021, Ta_2 released a statement apologizing for his "careless behavior." On December 27, 2021, it was announced that Oldcodex was set to disband following the release of the theme song for the upcoming Free! movie on the original soundtrack album which is scheduled for April 2022. Ta_2 and Yorke both shared their feelings about the announcement on the exclusive fanclub site, which was closed down at 12PM local time on March 1, 2022.
They officially disbanded on May 31, 2022. The official website and Twitter account for the band were shut down on August 31, 2022. The band's website now redirects to the Lantis website.

Members

Final members 
Ta_2 – vocals
YORKE. – paints, lyrics
Ryo Yamagata – drums
Taizo Nakamura – bass guitar
Shinji Ōmura – guitar

Former members 
R.O.N – guitar, arrangement
YoHsKE – guitar
Sae – drums
Yoshihiro Nakao – guitar
Hiromitsu Kawashima – bass guitar
Masanori Mine – guitar

Discography

Albums 
Studio albums

Mini albums

Singles

As guest artists

DVDs 
 Harsh Wind Tour live (October 21, 2011)
 Catalrhythm Tour (March 20, 2013)
 Contrast Silver Tour final live (December 25, 2013)
 OLDCODEX Live Blu-ray "ONE PLEDGES" 2015 in ZEPP DIVERCITY (2015)
 OLDCODEX Live Blu-ray "Capture" 2015 in Budokan (August 26, 2015)
 OLDCODEX Live Blu-ray "Veni Vidi" 2016 in Budokan (August 24, 2016)
 OLDCODEX Live Blu-ray "Fixed Engine" 2016-2017 in Budokan (August 30, 2017)

References 
1.OLDCODEX to Perform at Nippon Budōkan Arena in February Anime News Network. July 13, 2014.

2.[MUSIC] OLDCODEX’s 3rd album 「A Silent, within The Roar」 AFA Channel. March 11, 2014.

3.OLDCODEX to release 3rd mini album in 2015 coolJAPAN Inc. December 18, 2014

4.OLDCODEX “Capture” 2015 in Budokan 11.02.2015 Relawan Konser. February 23, 2015

Japanese rock music groups
Lantis (company) artists
Musical groups established in 2009
Musical groups disestablished in 2022
2009 establishments in Japan
2022 disestablishments in Japan
Musical groups from Tokyo